This is a list of fictional characters appearing in the anime and manga series Yume no Crayon Oukoku.

Main and supporting characters

 Princess Silver is the princess of the Crayon Kingdom. Direct ancestor to the legendary Queen who defeated the Grim Reaper, she is his primary target.
 As an only child, Silver is spoiled, greedy, selfish and vain: which are only a few of her "Twelve bad habits".
 When her parents are changed into statues, Silver is determined to free them herself and she goes after the boy who she believes is the Grim Reaper. She truly cares for those who are close to her, including Araessa and Stonston and the twelve magic vegetables.
 She has a love/hate relationship with Prince Cloud. When she first meets him, she describes him to be "handsome" and that he has "the Kings blond hair and the Queen's blue eyes". She gets extremely angry at him for constantly reproaching her about her "Twelve bad habits" and often tells him that she hates him. However, she shares many "romantic moments" with him, which usually consists of her mistaking an insult for a compliment, gazing at him blushingly, only to be brought back to her senses once she realizes that he had insulted her. She once tells Araessa that she had "fallen in love once, but decided never to do so again", after which an illusion of Prince Cloud is seen in her mind. She asks Prince Cloud to dance with her at the end of Episode 49, to which he accepts. In French Silver is known as "Princesse Diamant" (Princess Diamond)  and Italian "Luna Argentata" (Silver Moon)

 A pig that goes with Silver to find the grim reaper. He is very greedy. In French he is known as "Patachon"

 A chicken that goes with Silver. He is an orphan and was bought up by a tigress. In French he is known as "Nicorico".

 The boy who travels with Princess Silver. He is quite conceited and, like Princess Silver, is quick to anger. He specialises in sword-fighting. He has blond hair, blue eyes and is dressed in white tights, blue tunic and crown. Princess Silver has a crush on him and in some episodes, he seems return her feelings. In the first series he is 13 years old. In French he is known as "Prince Theo" and in Italian "Principe Claude".

 He is the object of Silver's quest, as only he can remove the curse on her parents. In French he is known as "Le Roi des Ombres" (The King of Shadows).

 Prime Minister in the Crayon Kingdom. He calls to check up on Princess Silver.

Vegetable Spirits
 Spirits encased in perfume bottles that are summoned when Princess Silver needs help.

Other characters

A cat who became the caretaker of Princess Silver after the Grim Reaper's sealing. She felt responsible for the angels escaping from the clock.

Debuted in episode 50. A mischievous angel who tends to be rough and short-tempered and cause mischief with Yukkutakku by shooting an arrow.

Debuted in episode 50. A mischievous angel who is calm and quiet and causes mischief with Shakatick.

Debuted in episode 50. A pink train that runs through a railway in the Crayon Kingdom.

Debuted in episode 50. The clock-shaped conductor of the Silver-go train.

References

Yume no Crayon Oukoku
Yume no Crayon Oukoku